"We Got That Cool" is a song written by Hanna Jäger and co-recorded and produced by Belgian DJ Yves V featuring Dutch DJ/producer Afrojack and Swedish duo Icona Pop. The song interpolates Crystal Waters' 1991 hit "Gypsy Woman (She's Homeless)". In the United States, the single reached number four on Billboard's Dance/Mix Show Airplay chart in November 2019. It was also featured in the FIFA 21 video game soundtrack.

Track listings
Digital download and stream
"We Got That Cool" – 3:33

Remixes
"We Got That Cool" (Anton Powers Extended) 
"We Got That Cool" (Anton Powers Radio Edit) 
"We Got That Cool" (Carta Extended) 
"We Got That Cool" (Carta Radio Edit) 
"We Got That Cool" (Carta DJ Edit) 
"We Got That Cool" (Robert Falcon, Jordan Jay Extended Remix) 
"We Got That Cool" (Robert Falcon, Jordan Jay Remix) 
"We Got That Cool" (Robert Falcon, Jordan Jay Dj Edit) 
"We Got That Cool" (Robert Falcon, Jordan Jay Instrumental Remix) 
"We Got That Cool" (Chico Rose Extended) 
"We Got That Cool" (Chico Rose DJ Edit) 
"We Got That Cool" (Chico Rose Radio Edit) 
"We Got That Cool" (Chico Rose Instrumental) 
"We Got That Cool" (Disto Extended) 
"We Got That Cool" (Disto Radio Edit) 
"We Got That Cool" (Buzz Low Extended) 
"We Got That Cool" (Buzz Low DJ Edit) 
"We Got That Cool" (Buzz Low Radio Edit)

Charts

Certifications

References

External links
Official video at YouTube

2019 songs
2019 singles
Electro house songs
Afrojack songs
Songs written by Afrojack
Icona Pop songs
Spinnin' Records singles
Warner Music Group singles
Songs written by Caroline Hjelt
Songs written by Aino Jawo